Crash Rickshaw is a side project of the post-hardcore band Project 86. It was founded by Alex Albert, Steven Dail and Joby Harris, with Randy Torres joining later. Crash Rickshaw released their self-titled album on September 11, 2001, on Tooth & Nail Records. Their second album, The Unknown Clarity, was released on iTunes on March 11, 2008.

Members 
 Joby Harris - vocals, guitar
 Randy Torres - guitar, background vocals
 Steven Dail - bass, background vocals
 Alex Albert - drums

Discography
 Crash Rickshaw (2001, Tooth & Nail Records)
 The Unknown Clarity (2008, independent release)

Alternative rock groups from California
Christian rock groups from California
Musical groups from Orange County, California
Musical groups established in 2001
Tooth & Nail Records artists